Australian Waterski and Wakeboard Federation, or AWWF is the governing body for the Waterskiing, Wakeboarding and Bare footing in Australia.

The AWWF has been structured as a sports discipline based organisation that reflects the operation of the sport within all States.  The sports disciplines currently comprise the Divisions of Tournament, Barefoot, Disabled, Show Skiing and Wakeboard, Cable Wakeboard (interim). Knee Boarding is represented in some States but not as a separate Division within AWWF.  Ski Racing Australia is a separate body but has close ties to the AWWF as we are both affiliated to the International Water Ski Federation.

The Federation services a projected 3500 registered competitive participants and approximately 1.3 million unregistered participants (statistical information obtained from the Sweeney report, state membership and boat registration sources).

The potential to develop the sport is constantly being addressed at both grass roots and high performance levels.Â  Progress to date in the high performance area has placed Australia amongst the very top nations in all disciplines.  In the last three years programs to increase entry level participation have been developed and implemented across Australia.  Our world rankings reflect the effort being undertaken in junior and senior developments.

The strength of the sport internationally is also on the rise.  We have been competing in the World Games since 1981 as well as the Pan American Games since 1995.  The Sports profile is on the increase due to events such as the Moomba Masters, World Games and the World Cup.   Our continued relationship with Water Ski Racing Australia (SRA) also ensures that indirect ties with major events such as the Bridge to Bridge and the Australian Ski Racing Grand Prix are maintained. Cable Wakeboard is currently a listed sport for possible inclusion into the 2020 Olympics.

With the exception of the Executive Officer and the Office Administrative Assistant in the National Office, all Directors, Administrators, Judges and Organisers are volunteers.  The AWWF arranges Public Liability Insurance for affiliated water ski clubs, sanctioned sites, competitions and training.  Membership also entitles members to Personal Accident Insurance for water ski related injuries and to travel insurance on international travel for water skiing events and training.  We negotiate water safety, access and policy matters with maritime authorities on behalf of both AWWF members and recreational skiers.

The AWWF continues to provide an umbrella administration that encompasses Junior, Senior, Masters, Female, Male, Indigenous and Disabled in all disciplines of the Sport.

AWWF Constitution 
The constitution of the AWWF can be viewed here.

AWWF Structure 
The Structure comprises up to 9 Directors, one from each active Division (currently 5), a Finance Director and a State Director.  Each State can apply to be affiliated as Member State which gives them voting rights at AWWF General Meetings. Currently all States are Members. Within each Division, there are State Based Divisional Committees.

AWWF Policies 

 Member Protection
 Divisional Selection Policies
 Anti-Doping Policy
 World Anti-Doping Code, International Standard
 AWWF Anti-Doping Policy
 Anti-Doping Awareness
 National Squad Team
 AWWF Rules and Regulations
 IWWF Rules and Regulations

References

External links
 

Sports governing bodies in Australia
Waterskiing
Wakeboarding
Water sports in Australia